The Roman Catholic Archdiocese of Pontianak is an archdiocese located in the city of Pontianak in West Kalimantan in Indonesia.

History
 11 February 1905: Established as the Apostolic Prefecture of Dutch Borneo from the Apostolic Vicariate of Batavia
 13 March 1918: Promoted as Apostolic Vicariate of Dutch Borneo
 21 May 1938: Renamed as Apostolic Vicariate of Pontianak
 3 January 1961: Promoted as Metropolitan Archdiocese of Pontianak

Leadership

 Archbishops of Pontianak (Roman rite)
 Archbishop Agustinus Agus (3 June 2014 – ...)
 Archbishop Hieronymus Herculanus Bumbun, O.F.M. Cap. (26 February 1977 – 3 June 2014 )
 Archbishop Herculanus J.M. van der Burgt, O.F.M. Cap. (3 January 1961 – 2 July 1976)
 Vicars Apostolic of Pontianak (Roman Rite) 
 Bishop Herculanus J.M. van der Burgt, O.F.M. Cap. (later Archbishop) (13 July 1957 – 3 January 1961)
 Bishop Tarcisius Henricus Josephus van Valenberg, O.F.M. Cap. (10 December 1934 – 13 July 1957)
 Vicars Apostolic of Dutch Borneo (Roman Rite) 
 Bishop Giovanni Pacificio Bos, O.F.M. Cap. (14 March 1918 – 1934)
 Bishop Giovanni Pacificio Bos, O.F.M. Cap. (10 April 1905 – 14 March 1918)

Suffragan dioceses
 Ketapang
 Sanggau
 Sintang

Sources

 GCatholic.org
 Catholic Hierarchy

Pontianak
Roman Catholic dioceses in Indonesia
Christian organizations established in 1905
West Kalimantan
Roman Catholic dioceses and prelatures established in the 20th century
1905 establishments in the Dutch East Indies